Tomas Bannerhed (born 1966) is a Swedish novelist. He won the August Prize in 2011 for the novel Korparna.

Selected bibliography
Korparna (novel, 2011)

References

21st-century Swedish novelists
August Prize winners
1966 births
Living people
Swedish male novelists